David Letterman is an American comedian and talk show host known for Late Night with David Letterman (1982-1993), Late Show with David Letterman (1993-2015) and My Next Guest Needs No Introduction (2018-present).

Major associations

Daytime Emmy Awards

Primetime Emmy Awards

American Comedy Awards

The Comedy Awards

Honors

Kennedy Center Honors

Mark Twain Prize for American Humor

Peabody Awards

References 

David Letterman